Campatonema tapantia is a moth of the family Geometridae first described by Sullivan in 2010. It is found in the provinces of Alajuela, Cartago and Heredia in Costa Rica. It has been found along a rather narrow elevational range, from 1100 to 1600 meters.

Adults are on the wing throughout the year.

Etymology
The name refers to Tapanti National Park, Costa Rica, the location where the species has been found most frequently.

External links
New species of the Neotropical genus Campatonema Jones (Geometridae, Ennominae) with the first description of the female

Ourapterygini
Moths described in 2010